A wild mouse is a type of roller coaster.

Wild mouse may also refer to:
 Wild Mouse (film), a 2017 Austrian comedy film
 Wild Mouse (Beech Bend Park), a roller coaster at Beech Bend Park in Kentucky
 Wild Mouse (Blackpool Pleasure Beach), a roller coaster at Blackpool Pleasure Beach in North West England
 Wild Mouse (Hersheypark), a roller coaster at Hersheypark in Pennsylvania
 Wild Mouse (Idlewild), a roller coaster at Idlewild and Soak Zone in Pennsylvania
 Wild Mouse (Lagoon), a roller coaster at Lagoon in Utah